Maktab Rendah Sains Mara Kuching (commonly known as MRSM Kuching) is a co-educational boarding school established in 1993 under the Education & Training (Secondary) Division of MARA (Majlis Amanah Rakyat, Malay for People's Trust Council). The campus is located in Petra Jaya, Kuching, the capital city of the Malaysian state of Sarawak.

History
In 1993, the Sarawak state government agreed to provide land for the construction of what was to be the first MRSM in East Malaysia.

MRSM Kuching started its venture as mini-MRSM, providing education from Form 1 to Form 3, as opposed to other MRSM Premier that provided education up until Form 5.

MARA Junior Science College (MJSC) Kuching (official name Maktab Rendah Sains MARA (MRSM) Kuching) began in the early 90s. In September 1993, the basic infrastructure of a school was completed and was handed over to MARA in December 1993. It was ready to take in students the following year. MARA Junior Science College Kuching is so named because it is in Petrajaya in Kuching area. The college is now facing CIDB Campus of Sarawak and adjacent to IKM (Institute Kemahiran MARA), Kuching. The amazing backdrop scenery of MRSM Kuching is the legendary Mount Santubong.

The first group instructors or came at the end of 1993. Their arrival were quite slow as the distance was far and there were a few affairs that needed to be resolved first. MRSM Kuching started operating in 1993/1994 and there was only 16 instructors and a principal.

The recruitment and placement of students started in the second semester of the 1993/94. The total intake of the first batch of students were 106 for Lower Secondary One. This amount did not meet the quota of 150 students because of late offers and problems from the Secondary Education Division, Headquarters Division and Ministry of Education. Despite starting late and the low number of students, the first session went smoothly and well.

External link 
 Official MRSM Kuching Website

Buildings and structures in Kuching
Educational institutions established in 1993
1993 establishments in Malaysia
Cambridge schools in Malaysia